III – Tri-Logy is the third and final studio album from the Finnish group Kingston Wall. The album name is sometimes cited as Tri-Logy or Tri~Logy.

This album was originally released under the band's own record label, Trinity, in autumn 1994. It was also licensed and released in Japan by Japanese Zero record label. Both of these prints have been sold out in the 1990s and are considered somewhat collector's items. In the original print, the front cover featured a Kingston Wall logo as a sticker on the jewel case.

In 1998, Finnish record label Zen Garden (later SonyBMG Finland) re-released the whole Kingston Wall discography as remastered versions along with a 2-disc limited print-version of each album which included a Bonus CD featuring rare/unreleased studio and live material. These 2-disc versions have also been sold out and are considered collectibles. The album is still available as a remastered 1-disc version from Zen Garden (2006). To date, Tri-Logy is the only original Kingston Wall album available on iTunes in the United States.

Track listing
"Another Piece of Cake" – 3:48 (Kingston Wall)
"Welcome to the Mirrorland" – 3:46 (Kingston Wall)
"I'm the King, I'm the Sun" – 4:56 (Kingston Wall)
"The Key: Will" – 1:07 (Kingston Wall)
"Take You to Sweet Harmony" – 3:24 (Kingston Wall)
"Get Rid of Your Fears" – 2:56 (Kingston Wall)
"When Something Old Dies" – 1:21 (Kingston Wall)
"Alt - land - is" – 5:12 (Kingston Wall)
"Party Goes On" – 4:25 (Kingston Wall)
"Stüldt Håjt" – 8:59 (Kingston Wall)
"For All Mankind" – 6:17 (Kingston Wall)
"Time" – 7:07 (Kingston Wall)
"The Real Thing  – 18:02 (Kingston Wall)

1998 re-issue limited edition bonus CD
"Skies Are Open" (live) – 7:24 (Kingston Wall)
"Third Stone from the Sun" (live) – 7:46 (J. Hendrix)
"Have You Seen the Pyg-Mies?" – 2:20 (Kingston Wall)

Track 1 is a live recording from Lepakko, Helsinki on December 5, 1994.
Track 2 is a live recording from City Sound, Turku on November 13, 1994. Recorded by Robert Palomäki.
Track 3 was originally released on the "Stüldt Håjt"-single. Recorded by Tom Vuori & Robert Palomäki.

Personnel
Petri Walli - guitars, vocals, mixing
Jukka Jylli - bass, backing vocals
Sami Kuoppamäki - drums, percussion
Sakari Kukko - saxophone ("The Real Thing")
Kimmo Kajasto - synthesizers
Carl Käki-Motion - Stüldt Håjt
Peter & Pan - didgeridoo & jaw harp
Tom Vuori and Robert Palomäki - recording, mixing
Henrik Otto Donner - editing
Bruno Maximus - cover painting
Otso Pohto - Kingston Wall-logo
Kie Von Hertzen - back cover design
Petteri Vilkki - graphic design, layout
Jouko Lehtola - photography

1994 albums
Kingston Wall albums